Roy Mack (December 14, 1889, New Brunswick, New Jersey - January 16, 1962, Los Angeles, California), born Leroy McClure, was an American director of film shorts, mostly comedy films, with 205 titles to his credit.

Born and raised in New Brunswick, New Jersey, he attended New Brunswick High School.

Selected filmography
Bubbles (1930) with Judy Garland
 The Silent Partner (1931)
Pie, Pie Blackbird (1932) with the Nicholas Brothers and Eubie Blake
Rufus Jones for President (1933) with Ethel Waters and Sammy Davis Jr.
That's the Spirit (1933) with Noble Sissle and an all black cast
Pleasure Island (1933) with Richard Powell
Paree, Paree (1934) with Bob Hope
Good Morning, Eve! (1934) early Technicolor short, with Leon Errol
Service With a Smile (1934) another early Technicolor short with Leon Errol
An All-Colored Vaudeville Show (1935)
Ups and Downs (1937)
One for the Book (1940)
Double or Nothing (1940)
Hillbilly Blitzkrieg (1942)

References

External links

1889 births
1962 deaths
Film directors from New Jersey
New Brunswick High School alumni
People from New Brunswick, New Jersey